Hailey Tuck (born April 25, 1990) is an alt-jazz singer from Austin, Texas.

Career 
Inspired by 1920s silent film actress and dancer Louise Brooks, Tuck moved to Paris, France at the age of eighteen after dropping out of a Baptist military boarding school. She spent her days in vintage clothing markets and nights singing in jazz bars. In April 2014, she released her debut EP, Hailey Tuck, and performed in Europe and Asia, including Cheltenham Jazz Festival in the UK and Umea Jazz Festival in Sweden. Her four sold-out shows at the Duc Des Lombards in Paris were featured live on the national radio station TSF. She also supported Jamie Cullum at La Cigale.

Tuck released her second EP, So in Love, in October 2014. She made her New York City debut at Joe's Pub in January 2015. Then in March 2015 she released her third EP, Delancey Street, which featured musicians Eric Harland on drums and Joe Sanders on bass.

Junk 

Tuck released her debut album, Junk, on CD, LP, and digital download on May 4, 2018.  It is a mix of cover songs and original material.  It was produced by Larry Klein, mixed by Tim Palmer, and published on the Sony Music record label.

Tuck + Cover, a follow-up EP with additional cover songs, was also released in 2018.

Discography

Singles

EPs as lead artist

EPs as featured artist

Studio albums

References

External links 
 Official site

1990 births
Living people
21st-century American singers
21st-century American women singers
American women jazz singers
American jazz singers
Jazz musicians from Texas
Musicians from Austin, Texas
Singers from Texas
Sony Music artists